Yinka Sanni, is the chief executive officer (CEO) of Africa Regions at the Standard Bank Group since April 2021. Immediately before his present position, he served as the  chief executive officer at Stanbic IBTC Holdings Plc., from 2017 until April 2021. His appointment was effective on 15 April 2021.

Early life and education
Sanni was born in Ibadan, Nigeria circa 1967. After attending primary and secondary schools locally, he was admitted to the University of Nigeria at Nsukka, graduating in 1987, with a Bachelor of Agriculture degree, with focus on Agricultural Economics. He then entered Obafemi Awolowo University where he earned a Masters in Business Administration (MBA) degree. In addition, he has over the years attended an Advanced Management Programme (AMP) from the Harvard Business School and advanced leadership and management programs at The Wharton School. He is also a  Fellow of the Chartered Institute of Stockbrokers of Nigeria.

Career 
Sanni began his banking career in 1990, in Lagos, at the Investment Banking & Trust Company Limited (IBTC). In 2005, IBTC merged with two commercial banks to form IBTC Chartered Bank.  In 2007, Standard Bank Group acquired IBTC and became known as Stanbic IBTC Holdings. Over the next 30 years, since joining the banking industry, Sanni has worked in various leadership roles in the sectors of retail banking, wholesale banking, and asset management. In January 2017, he was appointed as the chief executive officer at Stanbic IBTC Holding Company Plc. On 15 April 2021, he was promoted to his current position, replacing Sola David-Borha, who retired after 31 years at the company.

Family
Sanni is married to Foluke Olabisi Sanni (née Banwo), since October 1995. They have children.

References

External links
 Africa: Standard Bank Appoints Sanni Chief Executive for Africa As of 16 April 2021.

Living people
University of Nigeria alumni
Obafemi Awolowo University alumni
Nigerian bankers
Nigerian business executives
21st-century Nigerian businesspeople
1967 births
People from Ibadan
Yoruba bankers
Nigerian investment bankers
Nigerian Christians
20th-century births
Yoruba Christian clergy
Nigerian Christian clergy
Nigerian corporate directors
Nigerian chief executives
Standard Bank people